Kawice  is a village in the administrative district of Gmina Prochowice, within Legnica County, Lower Silesian Voivodeship, in south-western Poland.

The village has a population of 500.

References

Kawice